Dr. Henry Edward Turner (1816 - 1897) was a prominent physician and horticulturalist in Newport, Rhode Island in the late 19th century.

Family
Turner was the son of James Varnum Turner and Catharine Turner (née Greene) and the brother of William Greene Turner (1833-1917) a noted sculptor who served an officer in the Union Army during the Civil War.

He was the grandson of Dr. Peter Turner (1751-1822) who served as a surgeon in the 1st Rhode Island Regiment during the American Revolution.  Peter Turner was an Original Member of the Rhode Island Society of the Cincinnati.  Henry Turner was also a descendant of Roger Williams.

He was a cousin of Commodore Peter Turner (1803-1871), who served in the U.S. Navy in the early to middle 19th Century.  He was probably also a relation of Captain Daniel Turner who distinguished himself at the Battle of Lake Erie.

Career
Turner was a physician by profession and served as a civilian contract surgeon at Fort Adams in Newport during the American Civil War.  

He became a hereditary member of the Rhode Island Society of the Cincinnati as of 1882 and was a charter member of the Rhode Island Society of the Sons of the Revolution.

Turner was active in numerous organizations including the Newport Historical Society and the Artillery Company of Newport.

He was memorialized in the First Record Book of the Sons of the Revolution in the State of Rhode Island, 1896-1898.

He is buried in the Island Cemetery in Newport.

References

1816 births
1897 deaths
People from Newport, Rhode Island